Lee Township is the name of some places in the U.S. state of Iowa:

 Lee Township, Adair County, Iowa
 Lee Township, Buena Vista County, Iowa
 Lee Township, Franklin County, Iowa
 Lee Township, Madison County, Iowa
 Lee Township, Polk County, Iowa

See also
Lee Township (disambiguation)

Iowa township disambiguation pages